Cho Su-hyun (17 October 1948 – 26 May 2022) was a South Korean actor and entrepreneur. He won a Blue Dragon Film Award in the category Best New Actor for his performance in the film Long Live the Island Frogs. Il-ryong died in May 2022, at the age of 73.

References

External links 
 
 

1948 births
2022 deaths
South Korean male film actors
South Korean male stage actors
South Korean male television actors
20th-century South Korean male actors
South Korean businesspeople
Male actors from Seoul
Korea University alumni
Best New Actor for Blue Dragon Film Award winners